The Basilica and Convent of San Agustín is located in the historic centre of Lima, in front of the square of the same name, and a few blocks from the Plaza Mayor of the capital. Its care is, since its foundation, run by the Augustinian friars, and belongs to the Province of Our Lady of Grace of Peru.

Location in the city
The San Agustin Church is located at the junction of the fourth block of Jirón Camaná (Lartiga Street) with the second block of Jirón Ica (Street San Agustin).

Facade description and determination of its style
The facade is a Churrigueresque baroque architectural overloaded with ornaments, carved in stone, which was completed in 1710, consists of three blocks and three bodies, being the central street of the first body which houses the door through which enters the enclosure. On this one has a vertical arc cornice, be determinative feature original of Peruvian Baroque architecture. In the niches of the facade are ten images in addition to St. Augustine is the center.

Its importance is that it is also one of the two Churrigueresque facades left in Lima, together the facade of the Basilica of La Merced. Of the ancient temple, has only been the frontispiece and the side walls.

History
Its construction occupies the same place since its foundation, which occurred in 1573, has been rebuilt several times due to earthquakes that occurred in Lima, and also because of the extensions and the rugged Peruvian political life. One of the biggest events was the rebuilding of the church after the devastating 1746 Lima-Callao earthquake that left damage to the structure and resulted in a restoration in 1751 of it.

In 1908 the tower was demolished.

See also
List of buildings in Lima

Roman Catholic churches completed in 1710
Roman Catholic churches in Lima
Churrigueresque architecture in Peru
Augustinian orders
1573 establishments in the Spanish Empire
18th-century Roman Catholic church buildings in Peru